Parke Gerald Zinzan "Zin" Harris (18 July 1927 – 1 December 1991) was a New Zealand cricketer who played in nine Test matches between 1955 and 1965.

Harris was a member of the New Zealand team that toured South Africa in 1961–62 and drew the series two-all. He was New Zealand's top scorer, with 101 and 30, in the Third Test at Cape Town, which was New Zealand's first overseas Test victory.

Harris had two sons who played first-class cricket: Chris Harris, who went on to represent New Zealand, and Ben Harris who played for Canterbury and Otago. The unusual name of Zinzan – thought to be of Indian origin – is shared by several members of the Harris and related families: both Chris and Ben Harris have Zinzan as a middle name.

References

External links
 

1927 births
1991 deaths
Canterbury cricketers
New Zealand Test cricketers
New Zealand cricketers
Cricketers from Christchurch